Minervarya agricola (common name: common Indian cricket frog) is a species of frog that is native to Indian subcontinent. Earlier identified as M. granosa and Zakerana syhadrensis due to large distribution, the species was classified as a separate species in 2019.

Distribution
It is a widespread species in Indian subcontinent, and found in India, Sri Lanka and Nepal.

Ecology
It occupies a wide range of habitats from flooded fields and human habitation in the plains to the wet forests on the hills.

References

agricola
Frogs of Sri Lanka
Amphibians described in 1853